

This is a list of the National Register of Historic Places listings in Columbia County, Florida.

This is intended to be a complete list of the properties and districts on the National Register of Historic Places in Columbia County, Florida, United States. The locations of National Register properties and districts for which the latitude and longitude coordinates are included below, may be seen in a map.

There are 12 properties and districts listed on the National Register in the county.

Current listings

|}

See also

 List of National Historic Landmarks in Florida
 National Register of Historic Places listings in Florida

References

 
Columbia County